The Otto-Selz-Institute of Applied Psychology (OSI) (in German: Otto-Selz-Institut für Angewandte Psychologie) in Mannheim, Baden-Wuerttemberg, Germany is a psychological and interdisciplinary research institute and an associated institution within the University of Mannheim. Under the leadership of Prof. Dr. Georg W. Alpers, president of the Institute, and Prof. Dr. Sabine Matthäus, vice president of the institute, OSI employs a staff of about 20 researchers and additional support staff. The OSI was established in Mannheim in 1964 and is still headquartered there. The institute was named after the German pioneer of neuroscience and last director of the Handelshochschule Mannheim Otto Selz.

Research 
The institute is organized into 5 major research groups (ABs) and several support units:
 AB 1: Evaluation, Diagnostics and Methods
 AB 2: Psychobiology and Health
 AB 3: Cognitive Processes and Power
 AB 4: Economics and Organization Processes
 AB 5: Health Support and Education

Research 
The OSI works and researches in close collaboration with the Chair of Clinical and Biological Psychology and Psychotherapy of the University of Mannheim.

Publications 
This list is non-exhaustive:

 Werner W. Wittmann: Two faces of mental speed: Evidence on convergent and discriminant validity; Presented at 11th European Conference on Personality (organized by Karl Schweizer); Jena; July 2002.
 Werner W. Wittmann: Work motivation and level of performance: A disappointing relationship?; Published at XXV International Congress of Applied Psychology as part of the symposia "Integrative Approaches to Work Motivation: Ability and Non-ability Determinants of Regulatory Processes, Learning, and Performance" (organized by Ruth Kanfer); Singapore; Juli 2002.
 Werner W. Wittmann: Complex Problem-Solving via Simulations; Published at American Psychological Society (APS) as part of the symposia "New Directions in Cognitive Assessment" (organized by Pat Kyllonen); New Orleans, Louisiana; June 2002.
 Werner W. Wittmann: The reliability of change scores: Many misinterpretations of Lord and Cronbach by many others. Revisiting some basics for longitudinal research; Published at Methodology Conference "Evaluation of Change in Longitudinal Data"; Nuremberg; July 1997.
 Werner W. Wittmann, Heinz-Martin Süß: Challenging g-Mania in Intelligence Research: Answers not given, due to questions not asked; Presented at ISSID-Symposium: New Directions in ability research; Aarhus, Denmark; July 1997.
 Werner W. Wittmann: Gender Differences in Reading and Math - An international perspective and some potential consequences for the economy; Presented at the 12th Biennial Meeting of the International Society for the Study of Individual Differences (ISSID); Giessen; July 2007.
 Werner W. Wittmann: Gender Differences in Academic Success; Presented at the 12th Biennial Meeting of the International Society for the Study of Individual Differences (ISSID); Adelaide, Australia; July 2005.
 Werner W. Wittmann: Brunswik-Symmetry: A key concept for successful assessment in education and elsewhere; Presented at the 4th Spearman Conference (ETS); Philadelphia, Pennsylvania; October 2004.
 Werner W. Wittmann: Working memory and intelligence, looking at its relationship through Brunswik's lens; Presented at the annual APS-convention in a symposium "Working memory and intelligence: Controversy or consensus?" (organized by Phil Ackerman); Atlanta, Georgia; May/June 2003.
 Werner W. Wittmann: Brunswik-Symmetry, a Golden Key Concept to Disentangle Complexity; Invited contribution to a symposium titled "Advancing Psychological Science by Studying Complex Tasks and Expertise", (organized by Earl B. Hunt & Leo Gugerty); American Psychological Association Convention 2007; San Francisco, California; August 2007.

See also
 Mannheim
 University of Mannheim

Notes and references

Medical research institutes in Germany
Medical and health organisations based in Baden-Württemberg